This is a list of leafcutter ants, comprising 42 species from two genera: Atta and Acromyrmex.

References

Lists of ants